The high jump is a track and field event in which competitors must jump unaided over a horizontal bar placed at measured heights without dislodging it. In its modern, most-practiced format, a bar is placed between two standards with a crash mat for landing. Since ancient times, competitors have introduced increasingly effective techniques to arrive at the current form, and the current universally preferred method is the Fosbury Flop, in which athletes run towards the bar and leap head first with their back to the bar.

The discipline is, alongside the pole vault, one of two vertical clearance events in the Olympic athletics program. It is contested at the World Championships in Athletics and the World Athletics Indoor Championships, and is a common occurrence at track and field meets. The high jump was among the first events deemed acceptable for women, having been held at the 1928 Olympic Games.

Javier Sotomayor (Cuba) is the current men's record holder with a jump of  set in 1993 – the longest-standing record in the history of the men's high jump. Stefka Kostadinova (Bulgaria) has held the women's world record of  since 1987, also the longest-held record in the event.

Rules

The rules set for the high jump by World Athletics (previously named the IAAF) are Technical Rules TR26 and TR27 (previously Rules 181 and 182). Jumpers must take off from one foot. A jump is considered a failure if the jumper dislodges the bar or touches the ground or any object behind the bar before clearance.

Competitors may begin jumping at any height announced by the chief judge, or may pass at their own discretion. Most competitions state that three consecutive missed jumps, at any height or combination of heights, will eliminate the jumper from contention. The victory goes to the jumper who clears the greatest height during the final.

Tie breaking
If two or more jumpers tie for any place, the tie-breakers are: 1) the fewest misses at the height at which the tie occurred; and 2) the fewest misses throughout the competition. If the event remains tied for first place (or a limited-advancement position to a subsequent meet), the jumpers have a jump-off, beginning at the next height above their highest success. Jumpers have one attempt at each height. If only one succeeds, he or she wins; if more than one does, these try with the bar raised; if none does, all try with the bar lowered. This process was followed at the 2015 World Championship men's event. 

In the example jump-off above, the final cleared height is 1.88m, at which A B C and D each have one failure. D has two failures at lower heights compared to one each for the other three, who proceed to a jump-off at the next height above the final cleared height. C is eliminated in the second round of the jump-off 1.89m, then B wins in the third round.

A 2009 rule-change makes the jump-off optional, so that first place can be shared by agreement among tied athletes. This rule led to shared gold in the 2020 Olympic men's event held in 2021.

History

The first recorded high jump event took place in Scotland in the 19th century. Early jumpers used either an elaborate straight-on approach or a scissors technique. In later years, the bar was approached diagonally, and the jumper threw first the inside leg and then the other over the bar in a scissoring motion. 

Around the turn of the 20th century, techniques began to change, beginning with the Irish-American Michael Sweeney's Eastern cut-off  as a variation of the scissors technique. Even in 1948, John Winter of Australia won the gold medal of the 1948 London Olympics with this style. Besides, one of the most successful female high jumper, Iolanda Balaș of Romania, used this style to dominate women's high jump for about 10 years until her retirement at 1967.

Another American, George Horine, developed an even more efficient technique, the Western roll. In this style, the bar again is approached on a diagonal, but the inner leg is used for the take-off, while the outer leg is thrust up to lead the body sideways over the bar.

American and Soviet jumpers were the most successful for the next four decades, and they pioneered the straddle technique. Straddle jumpers took off as in the Western roll but rotated their torso, belly-down, around the bar, obtaining the most efficient and highest clearance up to that time. Straddle jumper Charles Dumas was the first to clear 7ft (2.13m), in 1956. Valeriy Brumel of the Soviet Union took over the event for the next four years, radically speeding up his approach run.

 

American coaches, including two-time NCAA champion Frank Costello of the University of Maryland, flocked to Russia to learn from Brumel and his coaches like Vladimir Dyachkov. However, it would be a solitary innovator at Oregon State University, Dick Fosbury, who would bring the high jump into the next century.

Taking advantage of the raised, softer, artificially-cushioned landing areas that were in use by then, Fosbury added a new twist to the outmoded Eastern cut-off. He directed himself over the bar head and shoulders first, going over on his back and landing in a fashion that would likely have resulted in serious injury in the old ground-level landing pits, which were usually filled with sawdust or sand mixtures. Around the same time, Debbie Brill independently came up with the same technique, which she called the 'Brill Bend'.

Since Fosbury used his new style, called the Fosbury Flop, to win the gold medal of the 1968 Mexico Olympics, it has spread quickly, and soon "floppers" were dominating international high jump competitions. The first flopper setting a world record was the American Dwight Stones, who cleared  in 1973. However, it was not until 1978 when a flopper, Sara Simeoni of Italy, broke the women's world record.

Successful high jumpers following Fosbury's lead also included the rival of Dwight Stones, -tall Franklin Jacobs of Paterson, New Jersey, who cleared ,   over his head (a feat equalled 27 years later by Stefan Holm of Sweden); Chinese record-setters Ni-chi Chin and Zhu Jianhua; Germans Gerd Wessig and Dietmar Mögenburg; Swedish Olympic medalist and former world record holder Patrik Sjöberg; female jumpers Ulrike Meyfarth of West Germany and Sara Simeoni of Italy.

In spite of this, the straddle technique did not disappear at once. In 1977, the 18-year-old Soviet straddler Vladimir Yashchenko set a new world record . In fact, from 2 June 1977 to 3 August 1978, almost 10 years after Fosbury's success, the men's and women's world records were still held by straddle jumpers Yashchenko and Ackermann respectively. However, they were the last world record holders using the straddle technique. Ackermann also won the gold medal of the 1976 Montreal Olympics, which was the last time for a straddle jumper (male or female) to win an Olympic medal.

She also won the gold medal of the 1980 Moscow Olympics, where Ackermann placed fourth. Since then, the flop style has been completely dominant. All other techniques were almost extinct in serious high jump competitions after late 1980s.

Technical aspects
Technique and form have evolved greatly over the history of high jump. The Fosbury Flop is currently considered the most efficient way for competitors to propel themselves over the bar.

Approach

For a Fosbury Flop, depending on the athlete's jump foot, they start on the right or left of the high jump mat, placing their jump foot farthest away from the mat. They take an eight- to ten-step approach, with the first three to five steps being in a straight line and the last five being on a curve. Athletes generally mark their approach in order to find as much consistency as possible.

The approach run can be more important than the takeoff. If a high jumper runs with bad timing or without enough aggression, clearing the bar becomes more of a challenge. The approach requires a certain shape or curve, the right amount of speed, and the correct number of strides. The approach angle is also critical for optimal height.

The straight run builds the momentum and sets the tone for a jump. The athlete starts by pushing off their takeoff foot with slow, powerful steps, then begins to accelerate. They should be running upright by the end of the straight portion.

The athlete's takeoff foot will be landing on the first step of the curve, and they will continue to accelerate, focusing their body towards the opposite back corner of the high jump mat. While staying erect and leaning away from the mat, the athlete takes their final two steps flat-footed, rolling from the heel to the toe.

Most great straddle jumpers run at angles of about 30 to 40 degrees. The length of the run is determined by the speed of the approach. A slower run requires about eight strides, but a faster high jumper might need about 13 strides. Greater speed allows a greater part of the body's forward momentum to be converted upward.

The J approach favored by Fosbury floppers allows for speed, the ability to turn in the air (centripetal force), and a good takeoff position, which helps turn horizontal momentum into vertical momentum. The approach should be a hard, controlled stride so that the athlete does not fall from running at an angle. Athletes should lean into the curve from their ankles, not their hips. This allows their hips to rotate during takeoff, which in turn allows their center of gravity to pass under the bar.

Takeoff
The takeoff can be double-arm or single-arm. In both cases, the plant foot should be the foot farthest from the bar, angled towards the opposite back corner of the mat, as they drive up the knee on their non-takeoff leg. This is accompanied by a one- or two-arm swing while driving the knee.

Unlike the straddle technique, where the takeoff foot is "planted" in the same spot regardless of the height of the bar, flop-style jumpers must adjust their approach run as the bar is raised so that their takeoff spot is slightly farther out from the bar. Jumpers attempting to reach record heights commonly fail when most of their energy is directed into the vertical effort and they knock the bar off the standards with the backs of their legs as they stall.

An effective approach shape can be derived from physics. For example, the rate of backward spin required as the jumper crosses the bar in order to facilitate shoulder clearance on the way up and foot clearance on the way down can be determined by computer simulation. This rotation rate can be back-calculated to determine the required angle of lean away from the bar at the moment of planting, based on how long the jumper is on the takeoff foot. This information, together with the jumper's speed, can be used to calculate the radius of the curved part of the approach. One can also work in the opposite direction by assuming a certain approach radius and determining the resulting backward rotation.
 
Drills can be practiced to solidify the approach. One drill is to run in a straight line and then run two to three circles spiraling into one another. Another is to run or skip a circle of any size two to three times in a row. It is important to leap upwards without first leaning into the bar, allowing the momentum of the J approach to carry the body across the bar.

Flight
The knee on the athlete's non-takeoff leg naturally turns their body, placing them in the air with their back to the bar. The athlete then drives their shoulders towards the back of their feet, arching their body over the bar. They can look over their shoulder to judge when to kick both feet over their head, causing their body to clear the bar and land on the mat.

All-time top 25

.

Men (outdoor)

Annulled marks
Ivan Ukhov jumped 2.41 in Doha on 10 May 2014. This performance was annulled due to doping offences.
Danil Lysenko jumped 2.40 in Monaco on 20 July 2018. This performance was annulled due to doping offences.

Women (outdoor)

Men (indoor)

Annulled marks
Ivan Ukhov jumped 2.42 in Prague on 25 February 2014. This performance was annulled due to doping offences.

Women (indoor)

Olympic medalists

Men

Women

World Championships medalists

Men

Women

World Indoor Championships medalists

Men

Women

 Known as the World Indoor Games.

Athletes with most medals
Athletes who have won multiple titles at the two most important competitions, the Olympic Games and the World Championships:
4 wins: Mariya Lasitskene (RUS) - Olympic Champion in 2020, World Champion in 2015, 2017 & 2019
4 wins: Mutaz Essa Barshim (QAT) - Olympic Champion in 2020, World Champion in 2017, 2019 & 2022
3 wins: Javier Sotomayor (CUB) - Olympic Champion in 1992, World Champion in 1993 & 1997
3 wins: Stefka Kostadinova (BUL) - Olympic Champion in 1996, World Champion in 1987 & 1995
2 wins: Gennadiy Avdeyenko (URS) - Olympic Champion in 1988, World Champion in 1983
2 wins: Charles Austin (USA) - Olympic Champion in 1996, World Champion in 1991
2 wins: Iolanda Balas (ROM) - Olympic Champion in 1960 & 1964
2 wins: Ulrike Meyfarth (FRG) - Olympic Champion in 1972 & 1984
2 wins: Heike Henkel (GER) - Olympic Champion in 1992, World Champion in 1991
2 wins: Hestrie Cloete (RSA) - World Champion in 2001 & 2003
2 wins: Blanka Vlašić (CRO) - World Champion in 2007 & 2009
2 wins: Anna Chicherova (RUS) - Olympic Champion in 2012, World Champion in 2011

Kostadinova and Sotomayor are the only high jumpers to have been Olympic Champion, World Champion and broken the world record.

Men

Women

Season's bests

Men

Women

See also

 List of high jump national champions (men)
 List of high jump national champions (women)
 Standing high jump

Sources 
 The Complete Book of Track and Field, by Tom McNab
 The World Almanac and Book of Facts, 2000

References

External links
IAAF high jump homepage
IAAF list of high-jump records in XML
Vertical Jump Resource

 
Events in track and field
Sports originating in Scotland
Summer Olympic disciplines in athletics
Jumping sports